The International Dunhuang Project (IDP) is an international collaborative effort to conserve, catalogue and digitise manuscripts, printed texts, paintings, textiles and artefacts from the Mogao caves at the Western Chinese city of Dunhuang and various other archaeological sites at the eastern end of the Silk Road.  The project was established by the British Library in 1994, and now includes twenty-two institutions in twelve countries.   the online IDP database comprised 143,290 catalogue entries and 538,821 images.  Most of the manuscripts in the IDP database are texts written in Chinese, but more than fifteen different scripts and languages are represented, including Brahmi, Kharosthi, Khotanese, Sanskrit, Tangut, Tibetan, Tocharian and Old Uyghur.

Victor H. Mair, Professor of Chinese Language and Literature at the University of Pennsylvania, has noted that there are many advantages of the IDP providing high resolution digital images of Dunhuang manuscripts online for access to all.  Whereas in years gone by scholars often needed to travel long distances to access the original manuscripts, or could only access them by means of low quality reproductions, now anyone can access images from the convenience of their computer, wherever they are in the world.  This not only makes research into these manuscripts easier, but helps in their conservation as there is far less need for them to be handled in person.  Moreover, the high quality images provided by the IDP often show up details that would be difficult to see with the human eye.

Activities 

The main activities of the IDP are the conserving, cataloguing, and digitising of manuscripts, woodblock prints, paintings, photographs and other artefacts in the collections material from Dunhuang and other Eastern Silk Road sites held by participating institutions.  Digitised images of the items in the IDP database are made available to the public on the IDP website.  The digital images are intended to be at least as legible as the original manuscripts, and allow scholars to access the material from anywhere in the world without causing any more damage to the fragile items themselves.

The central core of the project is the online database of catalogue records and images.  This is intended to serve three main purposes:
 to act as a replacement for tools previously used by institutions to manage their collections;
 to act as a replacement for the offline catalogues previously used by scholars to access the collections;
 to provide additional functionality that will make the database an important scholarly tool.

In 2002, Lynne Brindley, Chief Executive Officer of the British Library, put forward the International Dunhuang Project as a good example of the sort of complex, collaborative, and international digitisation projects that the British Library was increasingly engaged in.  She explained that none of the individual institutions participating in the project had the resources or facilities to allow scholars full access to all of the manuscripts in their collections, but by joining together and sharing knowledge and resources the institutions would be able to offer access to the combined collections of all the institutions by means of high-quality digital images.  She noted that a digitisation project such as the IDP benefits both the institutions involved, who are often able to obtain more substantial funding than they would for an internal project, and also the scholarly community, who are given access through the digital images to fragile and often inaccessible items that might previously have been difficult or impossible to view.

Cataloguing 
Catalogue records are stored in XML format on a relational database using the 4th Dimension database management tool.  Records can be searched for by means of an online search form that allows users to restrict the search on the basis of a number of different criteria, such as type of artefact, holding institute, archaeological site, and language or script.  The database was updated to support Unicode in 2010, and the IDP website is now fully encoded using UTF-8, allowing characters from most of the ancient and modern scripts found in the manuscripts to be added to the catalogue records.

Each online catalogue record incorporates a physical description of the item, catalogue records from existing print sources, translations if available, and bibliographic references.  The IDP also encourages scholarly users to submit their own catalogue entries and research results on individual items for addition to the database.

To facilitate the locating of items on the IDP database the project has also digitised a large number of catalogues and bibliographic sources, and made them available online, with links from the original catalogue entries to the corresponding online catalogue entry in the IDP database.

Conservation 
In order to better understand how to conserve the fragile materials that most of the items in the IDP database are made from (paper, textile, and wood), the IDP has supported a number of conservation projects (such as the analysis of paper and textile fibres), and has organised regular conferences on conservation issues at venues across the world.

In addition to developing techniques for the conservation and preservation of documents and artefacts, the IDP hopes to foster good conservation practices and common standards amongst participating institutes, ensuring that artefacts are stored under the most suitable conditions, and are handled as little as possible.

Digitisation 
The IDP centre at the British Library set up a digitisation studio in 2001, and now similar studios have been established at IDP centres across Europe and Asia.  In addition to making high-quality digital images of items, infrared photography is used for manuscripts with faded ink or which are otherwise hard to read in normal light.

Education 
The IDP also engages in various educational activities, organising exhibitions, workshops, and educational events for schools.

In 2004 the IDP organised a major exhibition entitled "The Silk Road: Trade, Travel, War and Faith", which was held at the British Library. This was the most successful exhibition ever held at the British Library, and attracted 155,000 visitors.

History 

The foundations for the project were laid in October 1993 when an international conference on Dunhuang Cave 17 was held at Sussex University.  This conference brought together curators and conservators from across the world, including the British Library, the Institute of Oriental Manuscripts of the Russian Academy of Sciences, Bibliothèque nationale de France, and the National Library of China, and in its aftermath an IDP Steering Group was set up by Graham Shaw (Deputy Director of the Oriental & India Office Collection at the British Library), Frances Wood (Head of the Chinese Section at the British Library), and Peter Lawson (Conservator at the British Library).  Susan Whitfield was appointed to edit the newsletter.  The first meeting of the IDP steering group was held on 11 April 1994, when the name International Dunhuang Project was adopted.  The first newsletter was published on 16 May 1994.

The IDP was initially founded with 3-year grant from the Chiang Ching-kuo Foundation, and had only one member of staff.  The following year the IDP database was designed and implemented, and in 1996 a grant from the British Academy allowed the hiring of a part-time research assistant to input catalogue data into the database.

In 1997, with funding of £148,000 from the Heritage Lottery Fund, the IDP started to digitise manuscripts held at the British Library, and in 1998 the database went online with an initial 20,000 catalogue entries and about 1,000 images of digitised manuscripts.

In 2001, with substantial support from the Mellon Foundation, work started on the digitisation of manuscripts held at collections in Paris and Beijing, and in 2003 digital images of Dunhuang paintings held at the British Museum were added to the database.  By 2004 the IDP database included images of some 50,000 manuscripts, paintings, artefacts, and historical photographs.

IDP Centres were opened in Beijing in 2001, in St. Petersburg and Kyoto in 2004, in Berlin in 2005, in Dunhuang in 2007, in Paris in 2008, and in Seoul in 2010.

The first director of the IDP was Susan Whitfield, who retired from the position in July 2017.

Participating institutions 
The following institutions are participating in the project.

 British Library, London, England
 British Museum, London, England
 Victoria and Albert Museum, London, England
 Chester Beatty Library, Dublin, Ireland
 National Library of China, Beijing, China
 Dunhuang Research Academy, Dunhuang, China
 Academia Sinica, Taipei, Taiwan
 Institute of Oriental Manuscripts (prior to 2007 the St Petersburg branch of the Institute of Oriental Studies), St. Petersburg, Russia
 National Museum of India, New Delhi, India
 Ryukoku University, Kyoto, Japan
 State Library, Berlin, Germany
 Berlin-Brandenburg Academy of Sciences and Humanities, Berlin, Germany
 Bibliothèque nationale de France, Paris, France
 Musée Guimet, Paris, France
 National Museum of Ethnography, Stockholm, Sweden
 Sven Hedin Foundation, Stockholm, Sweden
 Freer Gallery of Art, Smithsonian Institution, Washington DC, USA
 University of California at Los Angeles, USA
 Princeton University, (Gest Library and Art Museum), Princeton, USA
 Morgan Library, New York, USA
 Research Institute of Korean Studies, Korea University, Seoul, South Korea
 Royal Danish Library, Copenhagen, Denmark

IDP Centres 
The International Dunhuang Project has centres in seven countries.  The London centre, based at the British Library, acts as the directorate for the IDP, and is responsible for maintaining the IDP database and the main English-language website.  The other centres maintain local-language versions of the IDP website, currently Chinese, French, German, Japanese, Korea, and Russian.  Each centre is responsible for the conservation, cataloguing, and digitisation of manuscripts in its country.  The staff at these centres help train participating institutions in the use of digitisation equipment and computer software, as well as providing training in conservation and research techniques.

In addition to these centres, it is planned to open an IDP centre in Sweden, and digitise the Central Asian collections held in Swedish institutions.

Collections 
The IDP database includes material from a number of important collections held by participating institutions of the IDP.

The Stein Collections 

Aurel Stein (1862–1943) made four expeditions to Central Asia (1900–1901, 1906–1908, 1913–1916, and 1930–1931), during which he collected a vast amount of material, including a large number of manuscripts that he acquired from the 'Library Cave' (Cave 17) of the Mogao Caves at Dunhuang during his second expedition.  Some of the material that he collected, including murals, paintings, artefacts and manuscripts, was sent to India as his first three expeditions had been sponsored by the Indian government. Most of this material is now held at the National Museum of India in New Delhi, but a small amount of the material from his first expedition is held at the Indian Museum in Calcutta, and at Lahore Museum in Pakistan.  The rest of the material collected by Stein was taken to England, and is now shared between the British Library, British Museum, and the Victoria and Albert Museum.

The British Library holds over 45,000 items collected by Stein, mostly comprising manuscripts, printed texts, and inscribed pieces of wood, written in a wide variety of scripts and languages, including Chinese, Tibetan, Sanskrit, Tangut, Khotanese, Tocharian, Sogdian, Uyghur, Turkic and Mongolian:

 about 14,000 scrolls and paper fragments in Chinese from Dunhuang Cave 17
 about 5,000 paper fragments and 4,000 woodlsips in Chinese from sites other than Dunhuang
 about 3,100 scrolls and pages in Tibetan from Dunhuang
 about 2,300 woodslips in Tibetan from Miran and Mazar Tagh
 about 1,000 paper fragments in Tibetan from Khara-Khoto and Etsin-gol
 about 700 paper fragments in Tibetan from other sites
 about 7,000 items in Brahmi and Kharosthi
 about 6,000 paper fragments in Tangut
 about 50 scrolls, 2,000 paper fragments and 100 woodslips in Khotanese
 about 1,200 items in Tocharian
 about 400 items in Old Turkic and Uyghur
 about 150 items in Sogdian

The British Library Stein Collection also includes some artefacts such as textile fragments, sutra wrappers and paste brushes, as well as over 10,000 photographs, negatives and lantern slides taken by Stein.

The British Museum holds a collection of over 1,500 archaeological artefacts collected from various Silk Road sites by Stein, as well as non-literary items from Dunhuang Cave 17, comprising more than 240 paintings on silk or paper, 200 textiles, and about 30 woodblock prints.  The museum also holds over 4,000 coins collected by Stein, about three quarters of which are Chinese, and most of the rest are Islamic.  Images of all of the paintings and some of the artefacts are now included in the IDP database, and the coins may be added at a future date.

The Victoria and Albert Museum holds a collection of more than 650 textiles collected by Stein from various Silk Road sites, all of which have now been added to the IDP database.

Many of Stein's personal papers and diaries are held at the Western Manuscript Department of the Bodleian Library at Oxford University.  A collection of personal papers and photographs held at the library of the Hungarian Academy of Sciences have been added to the IDP database.

The removal by Stein of so much cultural and archaeological material from China has caused anger in China, and there have been calls for the texts and artefacts collected by Stein from Dunhuang that are now in the British Museum and British Library to be repatriated to China.  Although the Chinese government has not formally requested their return, in 2003 an official at the Chinese Embassy in London stated that "[l]ittle by little, we will expect to see the return of items taken from Dunhuang — they should go back to their original place".

The Hoernle Collection 
The Hoernle Collection, named after Augustus Hoernle (1841–1918), is a collection of Central Asian manuscripts collected by the Indian government.  22 consignments were sent to Hoernle in Calcutta between 1895 and 1899, and these were sent to the British Museum in 1902.  A further ten consignments were sent to Hoernle in London after his retirement in 1899.  The Hoernle Collection, which comprises over 2,000 Sanskrit manuscripts, 1,200 Tocharian manuscripts, and about 250 Khotanese manuscripts, as well as a few Chinese, Persian and Uyghur manuscripts, is now held by the British Library.

The Pelliot Collection 

Paul Pelliot (1878–1945) led an expedition to Kucha and Dunhuang between 1906 and 1908. In Kucha and elsewhere in Chinese Turkestan he collected hundreds of woodslips with inscriptions in Sanskrit and Tocharian. Pelliot arrived at the Mogao Caves at Dunhuang a year after Stein, where he acquired thousands of manuscripts from the 'Library Cave' (Cave 17), as well as hundreds of manuscripts and printed texts from Caves 464 and 465.  The items collected by Pelliot are held at the Bibliothèque nationale de France, and are divided into the following sub-collections:

 Pelliot Tibetan : 4,174 manuscripts and woodblock prints in Tibetan
 Pelliot Chinese : about 3,000 scrolls, booklets, paintings and woodblock prints, and around 700 fragments, in Chinese
 Pelliot Sanskrit : about 4,000 fragments in Sanskrit
 Pelliot Kuchean : about 2,000 woodslips and paper fragments in Tocharian
 Pelliot Sogdian : about 40 Sogdian manuscripts
 Pelliot Uighur : about 20 Uyghur manuscripts
 Pelliot Khotanais : Khotanese manuscripts
 Pelliot Xixia : more than 200 items in the Tangut script, mostly woodblock prints (all discvovered in Cave 464 in March 1908)
 Pelliot divers : miscellaneous items

The Kozlov Collection 
Pyotr Kozlov (1863–1935) made an expedition to the Tangut fortress city of Khara-Khoto during 1907–1909.  The city had been abandoned in the late 14th century, and had been largely buried in sand for several hundred years.  Kozlov unearthed thousands of manuscripts and woodblock prints, mostly written in the dead Tangut language, which had been preserved beneath the sands of Khara-Khoto.  The collection of Tangut texts that Kozlov brought back from Khara-Khoto were originally housed in the museum of Alexander III of Russia in St Petersburg, but were transferred to the Asiatic Museum in 1911.  They are now held at the Institute of Oriental Manuscripts in St Petersburg.  In addition to the several thousand Tangut texts, the Kozlov Collection includes about 660 manuscripts and printed books in Chinese, mostly Buddhist texts.

The site of Khara-Khoto was excavated by Aurel Stein in 1917, during his third expedition, and several thousand Tangut manuscript fragments recovered by Stein are in the Stein Collection of the British Library.

The Oldenburg Collections 
Sergey Oldenburg (1863–1934), who was the first director of the Institute of Oriental Studies (formerly the Asiatic Museum) in St Petersburg, made two expeditions to Central Asia (1909–1910 and 1914–1915), which were to become known as the 'Russian Turkestan expeditions'.  During the first expedition Oldenburg explored a number of sites around Turpan, including Shikchin, Yarkhoto and Kucha, and collected murals, paintings, terracottas, and about one hundred manuscripts, mostly fragments written in the Brahmi script.  During his second expedition Oldenburg surveyed the Mogao Caves at Dunhuang, and revisited some of the sites in Turpan that he had visited during his first expedition.  He found a large number of artefacts and manuscript fragments (nearly 20,000 fragments, some of them tiny) at Dunhuang, and also purchased about 300 scrolls from local people.

Oldenburg's collections are shared between the Institute of Oriental Manuscripts and the Hermitage Museum.  The Institute of Oriental Manuscripts holds the more than 19,000 manuscript fragments and 365 manuscript scrolls collected from Dunhuang by Oldenburg, as well as about thirty manuscripts collected by Sergey Malov during an expedition to Khotan during 1909–1910, and some 183 Uyghur manuscripts collected by N. N. Krotkov, the Russian Consul in Urumqi and Ghulja.

The Hermitage Museum holds artefacts from both of Oldenburg's expeditions, including 66 Buddhist banners and banner-tops, 137 fragments of Buddhist silk paintings, 43 fragments of Buddhist paintings on paper, 24 murals, 38 pieces of textile, and eight manuscript fragments.  Oldenburg's personal papers, diaries, maps and photographs relating to the two expeditions are also held at the Hermitage.

Dunhuang Collections at the National Library of China 
During 1907–1908 Stein and Pelliot had visited Dunhuang, and had both purchased large quantities of manuscripts from Wang Yuanlu (c.1849–1931), a Taoist priest and self-proclaimed guardian of the Mogao Caves.  News of the discovery of these manuscripts was brought to the attention of Chinese scholars when Pelliot visited Beijing in 1909, and the renowned scholar and antiquarian Luo Zhenyu (1866–1940) persuaded the Ministry of Education to recover the 8,000 or so remaining manuscripts.  In 1910 Fu Baoshu 傅寶書 was dispatched to Dunhuang to bring the remaining manuscripts back to Beijing, although he left the Tibetan manuscripts behind.  Some of the manuscripts were stolen by the minister Li Shengduo 李盛鐸 shortly after they had arrived at the Ministry of Education, but soon after the Xinhai Revolution in 1911 the manuscripts were deposited in the newly founded Metropolitan Library (later to become the National Library of China).

The 8,697 manuscripts that Fu Baoshu brought back from Dunhuang form the core of the Dunhuang collection in the National Library of China, but they have since been augmented by various purchases and donations over the years, so that the library collection now amounts to some 16,000 items, including 4,000 small manuscript fragments.

The Ōtani Collections 
Ōtani Kōzui (1876–1948) was a hereditary Buddhist abbot from Kyoto, Japan, but he had studied in London, and after meeting the explorers Aurel Stein and Sven Hedin (1865–1952) he decided to explore Central Asia himself from a Buddhist perspective.  In 1902 he left England to return to Japan overland via St Petersburg, and together with four other returning Japanese students he made his way to Kashgar.  From Kashgar the expedition divided into two groups, Ōtani and two others travelling to Srinagar and India, before returning to Japan; and the two others exploring the region of Khotan and Turpan, and excavating the previously unexplored site of Kucha, before returning to Japan in 1904.  Ōtani became abbot of the Nishi Honganji Monastery in Kyoto on his father's death in 1903, and so was unable to personally take part in any further expeditions, but he financed further expeditions to Chinese Turkestan in 1908–1909 and 1910–1914.  The final expedition excavated the tombs of Astana outside the ancient city of Gaochang, taking back to Japan nine mummies and many grave goods and funerary texts.

The three Ōtani expeditions produced a large collection of manuscripts (especially Buddhist sutras), woodslips, murals, sculptures, textiles, coins, and seals.  These items were originally deposited in the Nishi Honganji Monastery, and later at Ōtani's residence, Villa Niraku in Kobe, but in 1914 Ōtani resigned as abbot due to a bribery scandal, and much of his collection was moved to Ōtani's villa in Lüshun, China.  His collection was later dispersed to various libraries, museums and collections across Japan, Korea, and China.

 The Omiya Library at Ryukoku University, Kyoto holds 8,000 miscellaneous items found in two wooden chests at Villa Niraku after Ōtani's death.  These include manuscript scrolls, manuscript booklets, printed texts, wooden slips, silk paintings, textiles, plant specimens, coins, and rubbings.  As well as Chinese texts, the collection includes documents written in 15 different languages and 13 different scripts, covering secular subjects as well as Manichaean Buddhist scriptures and Nestorian Christian texts.
 Tokyo National Museum holds various items from the Ōtani expeditions, including Chinese and Uyghur manuscripts and woodslips from Turpan, Dunhuang and elsewhere, as well as paintings from Dunhuang and Turpan.
 Kyoto National Museum holds a number of items from Ōtani's collection.
 Otani University, Kyoto holds 38 Dunhuang manuscripts, including 34 from Ōtani's collection.
 The Lüshun Museum in Dalian, China holds 16,035 Buddhist manuscript fragments from Turpan, as well as documents written in Brahmi, Sogdian, Tibetan, Tangut, and Uyghur.
 The National Library of China in Beijing holds 621 Dunhuang scrolls transferred from the Lüshun Museum.
 The National Museum of Korea in Seoul holds about 1,700 artefacts and 60 fragments of murals from the Bezeklik Caves that derived from Villa Niraku.

The Berlin Turpan Collections 
Four German expeditions to Turpan were made in the years 1902–1903, 1904–1905, 1905–1907, and 1913–1914, the first and third expeditions led by Albert Grünwedel (1856–1935), and the second and fourth expeditions led by Albert von Le Coq (1860–1930).  These expeditions brought back to Berlin a huge amount of material, including murals and other artefacts, as well as about 40,000 manuscript and woodblock fragments written in more than twenty different scripts and languages.  The items collected during these four expeditions are now divided between two institutions in Berlin.

 The Berlin-Brandenburg Academy of Sciences and Humanities holds about 6,000 Old Uyghur fragments, about 1,600 Chinese and Old Uyghur fragments, 800 Middle Persian and Old Turkic fragments (formerly in the collection of the Mainz Academy of Sciences and Literature), 3,500 Manichaean fragments in various languages (primarily Middle Persian, Parthian, Old Turkic and Sogdian), about 1,000 Sogdian and Chinese/Sogdian fragments, and about 300 Sogdian fragments in the Nestorian script.
 The Oriental Department of the Berlin State Library holds about 6,000 Chinese fragments, about 100 Mongolian fragments, about 300 Syriac fragments, about 200 Tibetan fragments, about 4,000 Tocharian fragments, and about 8,000 Sanskrit fragments.

The IDP has digitised over 14,000 items from these collection, mostly the Chinese, Brahmi and Sanskrit fragments.  The Middle Persian, Old Turkic and Mongolian fragments have been digitised as part of the Digital Turfan Archive hosted by the Berlin-Brandenburg Academy of Sciences and Humanities, and the Tocharian fragments have been digitised as part of the TITUS project of the Goethe University Frankfurt.

Notable items in the IDP database 
The following are some of the notable items in the IDP database.

Awards 
In November 2010 the IDP was awarded the Casa Asia Award by the Spanish governmental consortium, Casa Asia, for its work in digitizing and preserving manuscripts.

See also 
 Dunhuang manuscripts
 Digital library
 Institute of Oriental Manuscripts of the Russian Academy of Sciences
 List of Tangut books
 Mogoa caves
 Preservation (library and archival science)

Notes

References

External links 

 
 The New Yorker: A Secret Library, Digitally Excavated

Organizations established in 1994
British Library
Digital library projects
Preservation (library and archival science)
Archaeological databases
Dunhuang
Digital history projects